The women's featherweight (52 kg/114.64lbs) Thai-Boxing division at the W.A.K.O. European Championships 2004 in Budva was the lightest of the female Thai-Boxing tournaments and involved only two fighters.  Each of the matches was three rounds of two minutes each and were fought under Thai-Boxing rules.

As there were only two contestants both women went straight through to the final.  The gold medal was won by the Russian Ekaterina Dumbrava who defeated host nation Serbia and Montenegro's Milena Dincic by unanimous decision.

Results

Key

See also
List of WAKO Amateur European Championships
List of WAKO Amateur World Championships
List of female kickboxers

References

External links
 WAKO World Association of Kickboxing Organizations Official Site

W.A.K.O. European Championships 2004 (Budva)